The 1900–01 Colgate Raiders men's basketball team represented Colgate University during the 1900–01 college men's basketball season. The head coach was Ellery Huntington Sr. coaching the Raiders in his first season. The team finished with an overall record of 5–8.

Schedule

|-

References

Colgate Raiders men's basketball seasons
Colgate
Colgate
Colgate